Larim Rural District is a rural district (dehestan) in Gil Khuran District, Juybar County, Mazandaran Province, Iran. At the 2006 census, its population was 9,471, in 2,529 families. The rural district has 16 villages.

References 

Rural Districts of Mazandaran Province
Juybar County